Blue Streak McCoy is a lost 1920 American silent Western film starring Harry Carey.

Cast
 Harry Carey as Job McCoy
 Lila Leslie as Eileen Marlowe
 Charles Arling as Howard Marlowe
 B. Reeves Eason, Jr. (credited as Breezy Eason) as Albert Marlowe
 Ruth Fuller Golden (credited as Ruth Golden) as Diana Hughes
 Ray Ripley as Frank Otis
 Charles Le Moyne as Mulhall
 Ruth Royce as Conchita
 Ben Alexander

See also
 List of American films of 1920
 Harry Carey filmography

References

External links
 

1920 films
1920 lost films
1920 Western (genre) films
American black-and-white films
Films directed by B. Reeves Eason
Lost Western (genre) films
Lost American films
Silent American Western (genre) films
Universal Pictures films
1920s American films